La Dune Rose is an attraction in the city of Gao, Mali. The sand dune is named for its appearance at dawn and nightfall. It is also known as Koyma, the small town at its base.

References

Dune Rose
Gao Region